1998 was another tough year for the Waikato Chiefs rugby team in the Super 12 Tournament. This year winning 6 of their 11 games and finished 7th overall on the table, this year the team was coached by Ross Cooper and captain by Errol Brain.

Standing

Results

Squad

The Chiefs Squad for the 1998 season were:

Notes and references

External links
Official Chiefs website
Official Super Rugby website 
Official Facebook page

1998
1998 in New Zealand rugby union
1998 Super 12 season by team